Cehnice is a municipality and village in Strakonice District in the South Bohemian Region of the Czech Republic. It has about 500 inhabitants.

Administrative parts
The village of Dunovice is an administrative part of Cehnice.

References

Villages in Strakonice District